Cyclommatus elaphus is a species of the genus Cyclommatus from Indonesia. It is also the largest species of the genus Cyclommatus and can grow up to a maximum of 109 mm (4.29 inches) from the tip of the mandibles to the end of the abdomen.

References 

Lucanidae genera
Lucaninae
Beetles described in 1881